Chochenyo (also called Chocheño, Northern Ohlone and East Bay Costanoan) is the spoken language of the Chochenyo people. Chochenyo is one of the Ohlone languages in the Utian family.

Linguistically, Chochenyo, Tamyen and Ramaytush are thought to have been dialects of a single language, but Tamyen and Ramaytush are very poorly attested. The speech of the last two native speakers of Chochenyo was documented in the 1920s in the unpublished fieldnotes of the Bureau of American Ethnology linguist John Peabody Harrington. The final native speaker of the language was José Guzmán who died in 1934 in Niles, California.

The Muwekma Ohlone Tribe, which (as of 2007) is petitioning for U.S. federal recognition, has made efforts to revive the language. As of 2004, "the Chochenyo database being developed by the tribe ... [contained] from 1,000 to 2,000 basic words." By 2009, many students were able to carry on conversations in the Chochenyo language. Through both successful word formation, as well as extending documented words, the Chochenyo dictionary has grown significantly throughout the early 21st century. During the canonization of Saint Junípero Serra on September 23, 2015, the first reading at Mass was read in Chochenyo by Vincent Medina, a Muwekma Ohlone tribal member.

Phonology
Consonants

The vowels can be long or short. Prolongation is shown by repeating the vowel.
oo is pronounced /oː/, not /uː/

References

External links
 Chocheyno, California Language Archive
 Chochenyo language overview at the Survey of California and Other Indian Languages
 Chochenyo revitalization – language at UCB "Faith in Words" 2004 [archived version]
 Muwekma Ohlone Tribe website
 The Little Tribe That Could

Ohlone languages
Extinct languages of North America
Culture in the San Francisco Bay Area
History of the San Francisco Bay Area